Inga Bite (born 6 July 1981) is a Latvian politician. She is the member of the Zatlers' Reform Party and a deputy of the 11th Saeima (Latvian Parliament). She began her current term in parliament on 17 October 2011. She has graduated from University of Latvia.

References

1981 births
Living people
People from Ķekava Municipality
Reform Party (Latvia) politicians
Latvian Association of Regions politicians
Deputies of the 11th Saeima
Deputies of the 12th Saeima
Women deputies of the Saeima
Latvian jurists
University of Latvia alumni

21st-century Latvian women politicians